Dalikli Dash (also Romanized as Dalīklī Dāsh; also known as Dalīlaklīdāsh) is a village in Arshaq Sharqi Rural District, in the Central District of Ardabil County, Ardabil Province, Iran. At the 2006 census, its population was 54, in 16 families.

References 

Towns and villages in Ardabil County